Lintneria aurigutta is a moth of the  family Sphingidae. It is known from Peru, Bolivia and Argentina.

The wingspan is 52–58 mm. There are at least two generations per year with adults on  wing in March and again in December.

The larvae probably feed on Lamiaceae (such as Salvia), Hydrophylloideae (such as Wigandia) and Verbenaceae species (such as Lantana).

References

External links

Lintneria
Moths described in 1903